This list of tallest buildings in Bangladesh ranks skyscrapers in Bangladesh based on official height. Most of the high-rise buildings in Bangladesh are in the capital Dhaka.

Tallest buildings
This lists ranks buildings in Bangladesh based on official height. All the buildings listed below rise at least  from the ground. An asterisk (*) indicates that the building is still under construction, but has been Topped-out. The "Year" column indicates the year in which a building was completed.

Under construction 
This lists buildings that are under construction in Bangladesh and are planned to rise at least 400 feet (121 m). Buildings that have already been topped out are excluded.

Proposed, approved, or on hold 
This list ranks buildings that were once under construction and are now on hold and are planned to rise at least or 40 floors tall.

Approved

This lists buildings that are under construction in Bangladesh and are planned to rise at least 500 feet (152 m). Buildings that have already been topped out are excluded.

Proposed

This lists buildings that are under construction in Bangladesh and are planned to rise at least 500 feet (152 m). Buildings that have already been topped out are excluded.

Timeline of tallest buildings 
This is a list of buildings that once held the title of tallest building in Bangladesh.

See also

 List of tallest buildings in Dhaka
 List of tallest buildings in Chittagong
 List of tallest buildings in Sylhet
 List of tallest buildings and structures in South Asia
 List of tallest buildings in the World
 List of future tallest buildings
 List of tallest structures in the world

References

External links

Bangladesh
 
Bangladesh